Marisol is a Spanish name. It is a shortened form of María de la Soledad (literally "Mary of the solitude"), a title given to the Virgin Mary, corresponding to English "Our Lady of Solitude".

Coincidentally, Marisol sounds like "mar y sol", Spanish for "sea and sun". The name might be reinterpretated as such, but it is not the actual origin.

Marisol may refer to:

People 
 Marisol (actress) (born Josefa Flores Gonzalez, born 1948), Spanish singer and actress
 Marisol Argueta de Barillas (born 1968), Salvadoran politician
 Marisol Ayuso (born 1943), Spanish actress
 Marisol Deluna (born 1967), American fashion designer
 Marisol Escobar (1930-2016), French and Venezuelan sculptor known mononymically as Marisol
 Marisol Espinoza (born 1967), Peruvian politician
 Marisol González (born 1983), Mexican beauty queen
 Marisol Malaret (born 1949), Puerto Rican beauty queen
 Marisol Maldonado, American model
 Marisol Nichols (born 1973), American actress
 Marisol Touraine (born 1959), French politician
 Marisol Valles García (born 1989), Mexican police chief

Characters 
 Marisol Chavez in Oculus (film)
 Marisol Coxi, from Monster High
 Marisol Delko Caine in CSI: Miami
 Marisol Durán in The Cheetah Girls 2
 Marisol "Flaca" Gonzales in Orange Is the New Black
 Marisol Guzman, in Hard Love
 Marisol Lewis in Degrassi
 Marisol, recurring character in The Boss Baby: Back in Business
 Marisol Luna, character from the American Girl series of dolls and books
 Marisol Suarez in Devious Maids
 Marisol in Devour
 Marisol in Fistful of Dollars 
 Marisol in George Lopez (TV series)
 Marisol in Third and Indiana
 Marisol Fuentes in Mr. Iglesias
 Marisol de la Gorgonzola, character created by Brandon Rogers
 Marisol Vera, character in Charmed
 Marisol Sanchez, character in Vida (TV series)

Entertainment
 Marisol (Brazilian TV series), Brazilian television primetime TV series 
 Marisol (Mexican TV series), a 1996 Mexican telenovela
 Marisol (play), a 1993 play by José Rivera
"Marisol", by Lotus, Feather on Wood (2009)
 "Marisol", a track from Emily Osment's debut studio album, Fight or Flight

Spanish feminine given names